The Samsung Galaxy Xcover 2 (GT-S7710) is a water and dust proof IP67 smartphone manufactured by Samsung that runs the Android operating system. Announced and released by Samsung in March 2013, the Galaxy Xcover 2 is the successor to the Xcover.  Xcover 2 itself was replaced by Xcover 3.

Features
The Galaxy Xcover 2 3G smartphone, with quad band GSM. It sports a display of a 4.0 inch PLS TFT LCD capacitive touchscreen with 16M colours WVGA (480x800) resolution. It has a 5-megapixel autofocus camera with LED flash with a VGA front-facing camera. It comes with a 1700 mAh Li-Ion battery.

The Galaxy Xcover 2 comes with Android 4.1.2 Jelly Bean. Bundled with Music Hub 3.0, Game Hub 2.0, Chat-On and Samsung Apps.

See also
 List of Android devices
 Samsung Galaxy
 Samsung Rugby Smart

References 

Samsung mobile phones
Samsung Galaxy
Android (operating system) devices
Mobile phones introduced in 2013
Mobile phones with user-replaceable battery